Elena Kuschnerova (born 6 January 1959 in Moscow) is a Russian-born classical pianist.

Biography 
Elena Kuschnerova was born into a musical family in Moscow. She began her piano education at the age of five with her mother. At seven, she became a student of Tatyana Kestner at the Moscow Central Music School. At the age of nine, Kuschnerova made her first appearance with orchestra conducted by Aram Khachaturian playing Bach's Keyboard Concerto No. 5 in F minor, which was recorded by Radio Moscow. Upon graduation she studied at the Moscow Conservatory with Sergei Dorensky. After receiving her diploma (with honors) in 1982, she went on tour in the Soviet Union for the next eight years. Foreign appearances and participation in international competitions were not allowed by Soviet authorities.

In 1992 Kuschnerova emigrated to Germany and started a new career there. In the following years, she earned international acclaim giving concerts in Western Europe, USA and Japan. As a piano professor she taught master classes in Germany, Japan, South Korea, Sweden, and the USA. Since 2006 she has been guest professor at the Elisabeth University of Music in Hiroshima. Kuschnerova lives nowadays in Baden-Baden and in New York.

Music 
Several composers have written piano works for Kuschnerova, who also premiered most of them. 
 During her time as a student in Moscow, Kuschnerova was influenced by the composer Alexander Lokshin. In 1982 he dedicated a piano cycle "Prelude and Theme with Variations" to her. She premiered it the same year;
 Siegfried Matthus, "Die Sehnsucht nach der verlorenen Melodie" ("Longing for the lost tune"), piano concerto. First performance by Elena Kuschnerova 2002 in Dresden with Dresden Philharmonic orchestra, conductor Marek Janowski;
 Mikhail Kollontay, piano concerto op. 45. First performance by Elena Kuschnerova 2011 in the Grand Hall of the Moscow Conservatory, conductor Freddy Cadena;
 Mikhail Kollontay, Seven Romantic Ballads, op. 2bis.

Harold Schonberg, the former chief music critic for The New York Times, wrote about Kuschnerova's "Scriabin - 12 Études, Op. 8, 24 Preludes, Op. 11, 2 Poèmes, Op. 32" CD in the American Record Guide: "These are the best recorded performances I am familiar with".

Jürgen Otten names Kuschnerova in Die großen Pianisten der Gegenwart (The Great Pianists of Modern Times) together with Elisabeth Leonskaja and Lilya Zilberstein as the three most notable Russian female pianists. He acknowledges her "flawless technique" and "enormous tonal wisardry" and calls her "pianist par excellence".

Kuschnerova is a Steinway Artist since 2001.

Selected recordings 
 Peter Tschaikowsky, Robert Schumann, Frédéric Chopin, Gounod–Liszt, Claude Debussy, Sergei Prokofiev. Bella Musica, 1996
 Sergei Prokofiev - Romeo & Juliet, Ten Pieces for Piano, Op. 75, Piano Sonata No. 2 in D Minor, Op. 14, March from the Opera The Love for Three Oranges, Op. 33. Ars Musici (GER), 1997
 Alexander Scriabin - 12 Études, Op. 8, 24 Preludes, Op. 11, 2 Poèmes, Op. 32. Ars Musici, 2000
 Johann Sebastian Bach - Italian concerto, BWV 971, French Suite No. 2 in C minor, BWV 813, Toccata in E minor, BWV 914, Partita No. 6, BWV 830, Prelude and Fugue in C minor, BWV 871, from The Well-Tempered Clavier. Orfeo, 2001
 Modest Mussorgsky - Pictures at an Exhibition, Piano pieces. Orfeo, 2002
 Live in Tokyo (Domenico Scarlatti, Claude Debussy, Maurice Ravel, Sergei Prokofiev, Bach–Siloti). Steinway Japan, 2002
 Igor Stravinsky - Piano works. Ars Produktion, 2005
 Johannes Brahms - Piano pieces, Op. 116–119. Ars Produktion, 2005
 Johannes Brahms - Four Ballads, Op. 10. Mikhail Kollontay  - Romantic Ballads, Op. 2bis. Ars Produktion, 2008 
 Frédéric Chopin - Piano concertos Nos. 1 & 2 (arr. chamber ensemble). Major, 2010
 Frédéric Chopin - Piano concertos Nos. 1 & 2. Major, 2010.
 Robert Schumann - Faschingsschwank aus Wien, Op. 26, Beethoven Études, WoO 31, Variations on the name "Abegg", Op. 1, Fantasiestücke, Op. 12. Glor, 2011
 Robert Schumann - Carnaval, Op.9, Symphonic Études, Op. 13. Glor, 2012
 Mikhail Kollontay - Piano Concerto No. 2, Op. 45. Sergei Prokofiev - Piano Concerto No. 4, Op. 53. Moscow Radio, 2015
 Johann Sebastian Bach - Well-Tempered Clavier, Book I. Major, 2015

References

External links 
 Elena Kuschnerova web site
 Elena Kuschnerova youtube channel
 Genealogy on Pianists Corner
 Playlist on Pianists Corner

1959 births
Living people
Moscow Conservatory alumni
20th-century classical pianists
21st-century classical pianists
German classical pianists
German women pianists
Jewish classical pianists
Russian classical pianists
Russian women pianists
Soviet classical pianists
German people of Russian-Jewish descent
Russian emigrants to Germany
Women classical pianists
20th-century women pianists
21st-century women pianists